The vice-chancellor of Banaras Hindu University (VC-BHU) is the chief administrator, and a full-time salaried officer of the Banaras Hindu University. The vice-chancellor derives his powers from sections 7(B) and 7(C) of the Banaras Hindu University Act (BHU Act) and from the statutes of the said act.

Although the chancellor of Banaras Hindu University, preceding the vice-chancellor, is the "head of the university" under the BHU Act, it is only a titular position. The vice-chancellor is the principal executive and academic officer of the university. She or he is the ex-officio chairperson of the Executive Council, the Academic Council, and the Finance Committee of the university.

Applications for the appointment of vice-chancellor of Banaras Hindu University are invited openly by the Ministry of Education, which recommends the candidate to the president of India. Upon their satisfaction, the president appoints the vice-chancellor. Per the BHU Act, vice-chancellors of the university have a three-year tenure in the office. They are, however, eligible for a second term of appointment upon expiration of the first term. The maximum age for holding the office is 65 years. When a vice-chancellor leaves office by the means of retirement, resignation, death, or ill-health, the rector assumes the office as officiating vice-chancellor to avoid interregnum.

There have been 28 vice-chancellors since the establishment of the university.

On 7 January 2022, Prof. Sudhir K. Jain took office as the current and 28th vice-chancellor of Banaras Hindu University.

Chronological list
The vice-chancellors of Banaras Hindu University, in the chronological order, are as follows:

Timeline

See also 

 List of Banaras Hindu University people
 List of Banaras Hindu University festivals

References

 
Banarus
Banaras Hindu University